Ram Dayal (born 29 October 1988) is an Indian first-class cricketer who plays for Jammu & Kashmir.

References

External links
 

1988 births
Living people
Indian cricketers
Jammu and Kashmir cricketers
People from Jammu